Indian cookbooks are cookbooks written in India, or about Indian cooking. Some of the oldest cookbooks were written in India Indian cooking varies regionally and has evolved over the centuries due to various influences. Vegetarianism has made a significant impact on Indian cooking. Spices play a major role in Indian cooking.

Early Indian texts and cookbooks

Ayurvedic Samhitas (4th century BCE) suggests foods are used to support and bring out the three qualities of mind, namely sattvic foods, rajasic foods, and tamasic foods. Several Samhitas from Ayurveda texts describe and discusses methods to cook food and recipes, it mentions recipes for cooking rice in different ways, khichadi (rice-lentil dish), takra (curd dish), yusha (lentil dish), vesavara (minced meat dish), different methods to cook grains and pulses in various ways etc. Texts further discusses different ways to use meats, milk and milk products, vegetables, fruits, leafy greens, roots, oils, sugarcane products to prepare foods.  Among spice blends, it lists "Trikatu"; mixture of long pepper, black pepper, dried ginger. "Trijataka"; mixture of cinnamomum tamala, cardamoms, cinnamon. "Pancakola"; long pepper, long-pepper roots, piper chaba, plumbago zeylanica, dry ginger. These spice blends are mentioned alongside turmeric, cumin seeds, coriander seeds, dried mango, mustard seeds, asafotieda and edible champor.  These spice blends also appear in medieval recipe cookbooks by the same name. A chapter in Sushruta Samhita is dedicated to dining etiquette, method of serving food and proper placement of each dish before the diner. This dining and serving etiquette is also adopted in medieval cookbooks with some variations. 

Sangam literature (6th century BCE to c. 3rd century CE) offers references to food and recipes during Sangam era, whether it's a feast at king's palace, meals in towns and countryside, at hamlets in forests and the rest-houses during travels. It describes cuisine of various landscapes and people who reside there, how they prepared food and what they served their guests in details. Poet Avvaiyar for example describes her hearty summer lunch as "steamed rice, smoked and mashed aubergine and tangy frothy buttermilk", while poet named Mudathama Kanniyar describes “Skewered goat meat, crispy fried vegetables, rice and over 16 varieties of dishes" as part of the royal lunch he was treated to in the palace of the Chola king. 

Lokopakara (1025 CE) written by Chavundaraya. This cookbook is compilation of vegetarian recipes. It deals with methods of cooking rice, lentils, pulses, barely, wheat, vegetables, leafy greens, shoots, roots, and flowers. Different methods of using spices and making blends for recipes. Cookwares and different uses for them for different recipes. Preservation of food and fruits to make pickles and papad. Methods of making butter, ghee and different ways to season them. Ingredient substitutions. A chapter is also dedicated to making  flavored yogurts and coagulated buffalo milk cheese for sweets. Sweets made from rice flour. Last chapter is dedicated to refreshments made from different types of fruits and ways to season them. 

Manasollasa (1130 AD) is notable text compiled during the rule of  Chalukya king Someshvara III in the
1130AD, contains recipes of vegetarian and non-vegetarian cuisines. It also contains a range of cuisines based on fermentation of cereals and flours. Among meat dishes, the text describes cuisines based on pork, venison, goat meat, wild fowls and fish among others. It has been suggested that Vaddaradhane, the Kannada text of Jain Acharya Sivakoti written in 920 AD, the mention of iddalige may be the earliest mention of Idali, followed by Manasollasa. 

Pakadarpana (1200 AD) is recipe book dealing with culinary art, this text is also known as Pākadarpaṇam, Pākaśāstra, Pākakalā, Nalapāka — It consists of 11 chapters known as Prakaraṇas. It lists both vegetarian and non-vegetarian food preparation. It provides details about several methods of cooking rice, meat, legumes, pulses, vegetables, fruits, refreshments, beverages and milk products. Among non-vegetarian rice preparations it includes several different kinds of Maṁsodana/Maṁsānna (meat rice), lāvaka maṁsodana (sparrow meat rice), and kukkuṭa maṁsodana (chicken rice) etc. Methods of preparing food according to seasons, seasoning food with spices according to season. Various vegetables prepared using different parts of the plants have been explained in the text. The method of sūpa (dehusked legumes cooked) preparation has been explained, horse gram (dolichos biflorus), black gram (vigna mungo), cow peas (vigna unguiculata), and chickpea (vicer arietinum) etc. Several Pānaka (refreshment) preparations made from mango, lemon, kokum, flowers and berries. Sweets made from milk products such as various types of flavored milk, flavored butter milk, pasyasam and flavored yogurts etc.

Soopa Shastra, (1508 A.D.) written by Mangarasa III, a follower of Jainism, is exclusively vegetarian. The ingredients and cooking methods are given detail, and even the types of utensils and ovens needed are mentioned. The second chapter describes  drinks, salty, sour and sweet in taste. Third chapter discusses nine types of payasa (kheer), eight types of cooked rice and 24 mixed rice dishes. The remaining three chapters include recipes for 20 dishes with eggplant, 16 dishes with jackfruit and 25 dishes made with raw bananas (plantains) and banana flowers. The last chapter contains recipes using bamboo shoots and myrobalan. Even though it was composed during the rule of a Jain ruler, some of the vegetarian ingredients mentioned, such as onions, are regarded inappropriate for strict Jains.

In the chapter, Pishtakadhyaya, food items made with flour like rotti (Roti), mandige, garige, dose (Dosa), iddali (Idli) have been mentioned. Ancient Kannada poetry has used the term ‘rotika’ even earlier.

Kshemakutuhala (1549 A.D) written by Ksemasarma, this cookbook deals with both vegetarian and non-vegetarian recipes. Among non-vegetarian recipes it includes meat of boar, lamb, goat, venison, rabbit, wild and domesticated pigs, game birds, peacocks, fish and tortoise. It lists nine methods of cooking meat. Different methods of cooking rice, pulses and lentils. Spice mixtures and adding them at different points while cooking. Cookwares and their methods of use for different recipes. Milk products, their preparation and making sweets. Longest chapter is dedicated to edible vegetables, leafy greens, flowers, fruits, stalks, bulbs and roots and various methods of cooking them. Last chapter is dedicated to refreshments. 

Bhojana Kutuhala (1675 A.D) written by Raghunatha between 1675 and 1700 discusses numerous ingredients and dishes then prevailing in the Maharashtra region. The text compiles many pre-excistant knowledge and ideas regarding food and cooking described in the Sanskrit texts of the ancient period (up to 5th cent. CE) and the medieval period (5th cent. CE to 17th cent. CE) in a comprehensive manner. A historical study on dietetics and culinary art, as reflected in ancient and medieval sources, is carried out in the second chapter. The treatises like Kṣemakutūhala of Kṣemaśarman and Pākadarpaṇa of Naḷa which discuss exclusively the topics dietetics and culinary art are introduced in the third chapter. The sixth chapter mainly discusses the preparations of various dishes as explained in the Siddhānnaprakaraṇa. The last chapter is a resume of the study comprising discussions and observations.

Sultanate and Mughal period cookbooks

Under Turkic Sultanate and Mughal period, several new cuisines were introduced like samosa, yahni, korma, kebab, keema, halva, haleem, Jalebi.  

The Ni'matnama (c. 1500) is a collection of the recipes during the rule of  Malwa Sultanate, Ghiyath Shahi, and his son and successor, Nasir Shah. It contains recipes for cooking as well as providing remedies and aphrodisiacs. It also includes a sections on the preparation of betel leaves. Unique pickles made from edible flowers are also mentioned in Ni'matnama cookbook. It includes recipes for preparation of minced meat (qīma), samosas, halva, sherbets. 

The first book of Ain-i-Akbari  (the third volume of the Akbarnama), written in 1590, gives several recipes, mainly those prevailing among the Mughal elite. Ain-i-Akbari divides recipes into three categories of Sufiyana; meat-free dishes, meat-and-rice dishes, and meats cooked with spices.

Alwan-e-Nemat 17th-century, 101 recipes from the kitchen of Mughal emperor Jahangir
 A chapter in Alwan-e-Nemat cookbook is also dedicated to dining etiquette. It describes method to lay out Dastarkhan, with leather mat spread over the ornate carpet to protect it, and then cloth spread over the mat before arranging prepared foods at the center. They ate together from large common plates similar to their Central Asian custom.

Nuskha-e-Shahjahani, Pilaf (seasoned rice) recipes from Shah Jahan's’s reign

British Period

The British rule saw publication of several cookbooks, some intended for the British elite, others for locals, often in languages like Gujarati, bangla and Hindi. These include
 Pak-Shastra, 1878, Gujarati
 Culinary Jotting for Madras, 1891, later republished as Vwyer's Indian Cookery
 Mistanna Pak, 1904, Bengali
 Bengal Sweets, Haldar  1921.
 Recipes-Of-All-Nations 1923, Countess Morphy, has an Indian section  which mentions gulgula, Halwa and khoa etc.
 Pak Chandrika, Maniram Sharma  1929, Hindi
 Indian Cookery, Veeraswamy 1930s, who established the oldest existing Indian restaurant in England.
 Vrahad Pak Vigyan, Pandit Nrisinghram, 1939, Hindi
 Navin-Pak shastra

The Bengali sweets, including the Rasgulla emerged in this period. Also "English Vegetables" (cabbage, cauliflower, tomato, turnip etc.) as they were at one time termed, became common.

Vrahad Pak Vigyan has a special section on "Angreji" (i.e. English) cooking that includes biscuits, breads ("double-roti"), tomato and mushroom dishes in addition to meat/egg (termed "non-vegetarian" in India) dishes.

During freedom struggle and After Indian Independence

 Dalda Cookbook, 1949?  An illustrated best seller published in English, Hindi, Tamil and Bengali by Dalda Advisory Service. Its Pakistani counterpart is still being published.
 Modern Cookery Vol I,  Thangam Philip,  1946
 Indian Cooking, Savitri Chawdhary 1954, written by an Indian housewife migrating to England.
 Pak Ratnakar,  1958

The large scale migration of families from Punjab and Sindh led to popularity of Samosa, Nan, Chhole, Karachi Halwa etc.  With migration of South Indians to North, South Indian dishes became common in the North.

Internationalization of Indian cooking
With large scale migration of Indians to North America, and with arrival of international influence in India, a new set of cookbook authors emerged.
 An Invitation to Indian Cooking, Madhur Jaffrey, (1973), who has since then written a series of popular cook books.
 Classic Indian Cooking, by Julie Sahni, 1980,   she is the founder of the Indian Cooking School, established 1973 in New York City.
 Lord Krishna's Cuisine: The Art of Indian Vegetarian Cooking Hardcover, Yamuna Devi, 1987

With the advent of TV and the internet, new food authors have emerged in the past few decades. There is significant international influence because International travel has become common. These include
 The Pleasures of Vegetarian Cooking, Tarla Dalal, 1974, followed by 170 other cookbook titles.

See also

 Cuisine
 Culinary art
 Food preparation
 Food writing
 Recipe

References

External links

 The Wikibooks' open-content cookbook anyone can edit
 Feeding America at Michigan State University Digital Library—a collection of influential early American cookbooks, including a large number of books specializing in immigrant cuisine
 Menus and Cookbooks at The New York Public Library

Food-related literary genres
Indian food writers

Indian cuisine